The 1993–94 season was the 79th season of the Isthmian League, which is an English football competition featuring semi-professional and amateur clubs from London, East and South East England. League consisted of four divisions.

Premier Division

The Premier Division consisted of 22 clubs, including 19 clubs from the previous season and three clubs promoted from Division One:
 Dorking
 Hitchin Town
 Molesey

League table

Division One

Division One consisted of 22 clubs, including 16 clubs from the previous season and six new clubs:

Clubs relegated from the Premier Division:
 Bognor Regis Town
 Staines Town
 Windsor & Eton

Clubs promoted from Division Two:
 Berkhamsted Town
 Ruislip Manor
 Worthing

League table

Division Two

Division Two consisted of 22 clubs, including 17 clubs from the previous season and five new clubs:

Clubs relegated from Division One:
 Aveley
 Lewes

Clubs promoted from Division Three:
 Aldershot Town
 Collier Row
 Thame United

League table

Division Three

Division Three consisted of 21 clubs, including 16 clubs from the previous season and five new clubs:
 Cheshunt, joined from the Spartan League
 Harefield United, relegated from Division Two
 Harlow Town, returned to the Isthmian League after one season without a league football
 Oxford City, joined from the South Midlands League
 Southall, relegated from Division Two

League table

See also
Isthmian League
1993–94 Northern Premier League
1993–94 Southern Football League

References

Isthmian League seasons
6